Bergljot Larsson (9 July 1883 – 29 December 1968) was a Norwegian nurse, educator, editor  and organizational leader. She was a founding member of the Norwegian Nurses Organization  (Norsk Sykepleierforbund) which she chaired from 1912 until 1935.

Biography
She was born in Kristiania (now Oslo), Norway.  She was a daughter of drawing teacher Ludvig Gustav Larsson (1857–1911) and Hilma Kristiane Hansen (1860–1937) She was a sister of artist  Brynjulf Larsson (1881–1920). She grew up at Rodeløkka in  Kristiania.  In 1905, Larsson took a one-year education for nurses at Kristiania Municipal Nursing School (later Ullevål College of Nursing). From 1908 to 1911, she worked at hospitals in Edinburgh.
She later  completed several short-term study stays in Europe and North America.
.

In 1912, Larsson participated in the International Council of Nurses World Conference in Cologne, Germany. She subsequently founded the Norwegian Nurses Organization (Norsk Sykepleierforbund)  in 1912. She chaired the association from 1912 to 1935.  From its foundation, the Norwegian Nursing Association was an organization for educated nurses and advocated for three-year basic education for all nurses.  After she resigned as chairman, she continued as secretary general and head of Nursing School operated by Norsk Sykepleierforbund. Larsson also edited the Nursing Journal (Sykepleien) from 1912 until her retirement in 1947. 

In 1919, she received the King's Medal of Merit (Kongens fortjenstmedalje) in gold, and in 1949 she was appointed as a Knight 1st Class in the Order of St. Olav. She died in Oslo and was buried in Vestre Gravlund.

References

Related reading
Bergljot Larsson (1883–1968) (Nordic Journal of Nursing Research. Vol 15, Issue 3, 1995)  
 Sigrun Hvalvik (2005) Bergljot Larsson og den moderne sykepleien  (Oslo: Akribe AS)

External links
Norsk Sykepleierforbund website

1883 births
1968 deaths
People from Oslo in health professions
Norwegian nurses
Norwegian educators
Norwegian magazine editors
Trade unionists from Oslo
Norwegian expatriates in Scotland
Recipients of the St. Olav's Medal
Burials at Vestre gravlund